Calyptronoma occidentalis is a pinnately compound leaved palm species which is endemic to Jamaica.  C. occidentalis stems grow singly and reach heights of 7–12 m, with stems 17–20 cm in diameter.  It grows in waterlogged areas near the banks of streams, up to an elevation of 800 m above sea level.

The species was first described by Swedish botanist Olof Swartz in 1797 in his Flora Indiae Occidentalis.

References

occidentalis
Trees of Jamaica
Plants described in 1797